Clostera brucei, the Bruce's prominent moth or Bruce's chocolate-tip, is a species of moth in the family Notodontidae (the prominents). It was first described by Henry Edwards in 1885 and it is found in North America.

The MONA or Hodges number for Clostera brucei is 7900.

References

Further reading

 
 
 

Notodontidae
Articles created by Qbugbot
Moths described in 1885